Wetterich is a surname. Notable people with it include:

Richy Werenski (born 1991), American golfer
Zach Werenski (born 1997), American ice hockey player

See also
Warenski